The Primrose Ring is a 1917 American silent drama film directed by Robert Z. Leonard and written by Marion Fairfax and Ruth Sawyer. The film stars Mae Murray, Tom Moore, Winter Hall, Billy Jacobs, Mayme Kelso, and Loretta Young. The film was released on May 7, 1917, by Paramount Pictures.

Plot

Cast
Mae Murray as Margaret MacLean
Tom Moore as Bob MacLean
Winter Hall as Dr. Ralph MacLean
Billy Jacobs as Sandy 
Mayme Kelso as Miss Foote
Loretta Young as Fairy

Preservation
With no prints of The Primrose Ring located in any film archives, it is a lost film.

References

External links

1917 films
1910s English-language films
Silent American drama films
1917 drama films
Paramount Pictures films
Films directed by Robert Z. Leonard
American black-and-white films
American silent feature films
Lost American films
1917 lost films
Lost drama films
1910s American films